George William Archer (October 1, 1939 – September 25, 2005) was an American professional golfer who won 13 events on the PGA Tour, including one major championship, the Masters in 1969.

Early years
Born in San Francisco, California, Archer was raised just south in San Mateo. He was kicked off the high school basketball team because he missed too many practices due to golf.

Tour career
Archer turned professional in 1964 and claimed the first of 13 victories on the PGA Tour at the Lucky International Open the following year.

The leading achievement of his career was his win at the Masters in 1969. In the first round, he fired a 67, good for second place behind Billy Casper. His subsequent rounds of 73-69-72 earned him a one-stroke victory over runners-up Casper, Tom Weiskopf, and George Knudson.

Archer's other top-10 finishes in the majors came at the U.S. Open (10th in 1969, fifth in 1971) and the PGA Championship (fourth in 1968).

Archer was hampered by injuries throughout his career and had surgery on his left wrist (1975), back (1979) and left shoulder (1987). In 1996, he had his right hip replaced and two years later became the first man to win on the Senior PGA Tour (now the PGA Tour Champions) after having a hip replacement. He won 19 times on the Senior Tour between 1989 and 2000, although he did not win a senior major. Archer is also the only player in PGA Tour Champions history to win a tournament in each of the first three decades of its existence.

Archer is considered one of the game's all-time great putters, and at one time held the PGA Tour record for fewest putts over four rounds with 94 putts at the Sea Pines Heritage in 1980 (1.3 per hole). The record stood for nine years, until broken by Kenny Knox in 1989.

Archer was known as the "Golfing Cowboy," due to a summer job in his youth at his friend and sponsor, Eugene Selvage's Lucky Hereford Ranch in Gilroy.

Archer made Masters history in 1983 when he employed its first female caddy, his 19-year-old daughter Elizabeth, in the first year that outside caddies were allowed at Augusta National. He finished tied for 12th, his third-best at Augusta and final top-20 finish in a major. At the time Liz was a sophomore at Stanford University and had caddied for her father at twenty previous events; a member of the Cardinal track team, she threw the javelin and discus. She started caddying for him on tour in the summer of 1980, prior to her senior year at Gilroy High School.

Death

Archer died of Burkitt's lymphoma – a lymphatic system malignancy – in Incline Village, Nevada in 2005, several days before his 66th birthday. He was survived by his wife, Donna, and two daughters, Elizabeth and Marilyn. He played his final round of golf with his wife in nearby Truckee on August 25, a month before his death.

Illiteracy
Six months after his death, Archer's widow, Donna, revealed in the March/April 2006 issue of Golf For Women magazine that he had suffered his entire life from a severe form of learning impairment. Despite years of effort and the consultation of many experts, he was never able to read more than the simplest sentences and could only write his own name. She reported that they never revealed this truth beyond their family and that Archer lived in constant fear that the secret of his illiteracy would be revealed.

In 2008, Donna created the George Archer Memorial Foundation for Literacy, a 501(c)(3) organization located in Incline Village, Nevada. The Foundation's mission is to raise funds to identify reading deficiencies, diagnose causes and effective treatments for learning disabilities, improve systems for training teachers, tutors and other educators in literacy issues, provide grants, stipends and scholarships for deserving students, and assist in the development of tools and techniques for the effective teaching of reading and writing skills. The Foundation's primary fundraiser is the George Archer Memorial Stroke of Genius Pro-Am golf tournament held every October since 2008 at the Peninsula Golf and Country Club, in San Mateo, California – the club at which Archer began his golf career.

Quotations
"One thing about golf is you don't know why you play bad and why you play good."
"When I joined the tour in 1964, I told my wife I wanted to play five years. Instead, I've played five careers."
"If it weren't for golf, I'd probably be a caddie today."
"Golf is like hunting and fishing.  What counts is the companionship and fellowship of friends, not what you catch or shoot."

Amateur wins
1963 Trans-Mississippi Amateur, San Francisco City Championship

Professional wins (43)

PGA Tour wins (13)

PGA Tour playoff record (4–3)

Other wins (7)
1963 Northern California Open, Northern California Medal Play
1964 Northern California Open
1967 Northern California Open
1969 Argentine Masters
1981 Colombian Open
1982 Philippines Invitational

Senior PGA Tour wins (19)

*Note: The 1993 Ameritech Senior Open was shortened to 36 holes due to lightning.

Senior PGA Tour Tour playoff record (4–2)

Other senior wins (4)
1990 Sports Shinko Cup, Princeville Classic
1991 Sports Shinko Cup
1994 Chrysler Cup (individual)

Major championships

Wins (1)

Results timeline

CUT = missed the half-way cut
WD = withdrew
"T" = tied

Summary

Most consecutive cuts made – 13 (1969 PGA – 1973 PGA)
Longest streak of top-10s – 3 (1968 PGA – 1969 U.S. Open)

See also
List of golfers with most Champions Tour wins

References

External links

An interview from 2003
The Secret They Shared  Golf For Women, March/April 2006
Sports Illustrated   cover: April 21, 1969
George Archer Memorial Foundation for Literacy

American male golfers
PGA Tour golfers
PGA Tour Champions golfers
Winners of men's major golf championships
Golfers from San Francisco
Deaths from lymphoma
Deaths from cancer in Nevada
1939 births
2005 deaths